The Ford Performance Centre, formerly Mastercard Centre For Hockey Excellence, is a hockey facility located in the Etobicoke district of Toronto, Ontario, Canada. It has four ice pads and is the official practice facility of the Toronto Maple Leafs NHL hockey team, and their AHL affiliate the Toronto Marlies. The building also houses offices for Hockey Canada and the Hockey Hall of Fame and was home to the Toronto Furies of the Canadian Women's Hockey League. The land is owned by the Toronto District School Board as 400 Kipling Avenue.

Facility
The Ford Performance Centre was built as a joint venture between the Toronto Maple Leafs, the City of Toronto government and the Lakeshore Lions Club at a cost of  million, after cost overruns drove up the cost from $33.65 million, to replace the nearby Lakeshore Lions Arena.  The Lions Club contributed $40 million to the project, with the city providing a $35.5 million loan guarantee.  The Toronto District School Board leased the land for the arena to the Lakeshore Lions for a 50-year term.  Maple Leaf Sports & Entertainment (MLSE) spent a further $5 million on training and medical facilities to make the building the practice rink of their two hockey teams, the Toronto Maple Leafs and Toronto Marlies.  The Toronto Maple Leafs Hockey School is also held at the arena. MLSE pays $600,000 annually to rent the building. Mastercard purchased the naming rights to the facility for $525,000 a year.

The facility, which is located at 400 Kipling Avenue in the New Toronto neighbourhood of Toronto, opened in September 2009. It has four NHL-sized rinks, one of which can be expanded to Olympic dimensions with 1000 seats, as well as extensive training facilities.  According to Mastercard, the arena is "the first community ice facility to be built in the Toronto-area in the last 25 years."

The arena was originally operated by the Lakeshore Lions Club, but in June 2011, with the arena unable to deal with its rising debt and on the verge of defaulting, the City of Toronto decided to take control and assume its $43.4 million debt.  The arena had planned to have a restaurant and sporting goods store at the facility, but were unable to find a tenant leading to the financial difficulties.

The city established the Lakeshore Arena Corporation, an arms-length corporation, on September 8, 2011, to take over the running of the arena, with the intention to return it to private management within 2–3 years. A city councillor suggested that MLSE, which operates BMO Field and the CNE Coliseum on behalf of the city, would be "the logical party" to take over the arena, and a spokesperson for the company said "while we don’t have any interest in purchasing the facility, we are open to discussing the possibility of managing the facility on behalf of the City of Toronto.  MLSE's executive vice president of venues and entertainment Bob Hunter said they would bid for the right to run the building.  After the arena's original loans expired and it was unable to find refinancing, the city provided a short-term loan.  In November 2015, after finding that the debt was unsustainable, the city voted to write off $8.1 million of the $40 million it was owed by the arena.

The arena is used by Hockey Canada for its national teams, as well as by numerous visiting National Hockey League teams. The NHL Alumni Association is also based at the Ford Performance Centre.

The rink is also available for ice rentals by the public for leagues, tournaments, private rentals and special events. The Faustina Hockey Club offers both community house league and Select Hockey programs at the Ford Performance Centre. On Saturdays from September through June, Ford provides open, free ice skating for families.  In 2011, it was the host venue for the third season of the CBC reality figure skating competition Battle of the Blades, and subsequently hosted the fourth season in 2013.

The venue hosted an international short track competition for the first time in November 2015.

In the first half of 2019, Ford acquired the naming rights to the facility for an undisclosed amount, renaming it the Ford Performance Centre.

References

External links

Ford Performance Centre Official Website
Faustina Hockey Club

Indoor arenas in Ontario
Indoor ice hockey venues in Canada
Maple Leaf Sports & Entertainment
Toronto Maple Leafs
Toronto Marlies
Toronto Furies
Ice hockey venues in Toronto
National Hockey League practice facilities
Sports venues in Toronto
Sports venues completed in 2009
Etobicoke
Schools in the TDSB
Toronto Lands Corporation
2009 establishments in Ontario
Ford Motor Company of Canada